In Greek mythology, Hypermnestra (Ancient Greek: Ὑπερμνήστρα Ὑpermnístra) or Hypermestra may refer to the following women:

 Hypermnestra, one of the Danaids.

Hypermnestra, daughter of Thestius and Eurythemis.
 Hypermestra, another name for Mestra, daughter of Erysichthon.

Notes

References 

 Apollodorus, The Library with an English Translation by Sir James George Frazer, F.B.A., F.R.S. in 2 Volumes, Cambridge, MA, Harvard University Press; London, William Heinemann Ltd. 1921. . Online version at the Perseus Digital Library. Greek text available from the same website.
Antoninus Liberalis, The Metamorphoses of Antoninus Liberalis translated by Francis Celoria (Routledge 1992). Online version at the Topos Text Project.

Princesses in Greek mythology
Danaids